Raambo 2 is a 2018 Indian Kannada-language action comedy drama film written and directed by Anil Kumar and produced by Atlanta Nagendra and Sharan. Featuring Sharan in the lead role, with Ashika Ranganath, Chikkanna, P. Ravishankar and Tabla Nani in the principal roles. A song sequence in the film has five of the leading ladies whom Sharan had paired with in his previous films. The film is co-funded by its technicians such as music director Arjun Janya, cinematographer Sudhakar S Raj, associate director Tharun Sudhir and editor K. M. Prakash. The film released across Karnataka on 18 May 2018.

Upon release, the film received good reviews from critics. The movie was declared semi-hit at box-office. The second half of the movie was reported to have been inspired by the 2015 Canadian movie Wrecker. This film was shot in various parts of North Karnataka region such as Gajendragad of Gadag district.

Plot
In GOA
Krishna (Sharan) a happy go person and a devotee of lord ganesha is in pursuit for the love of his life, and asks for his lords blessing for the same, when he comes across that girl -  Mayuri (Ashika Ranganth) a medical student and a party girl, they both meet up, have a good friendship and plan to go on an experimental long drive to decide on before falling for each other, and they meet up with DJ (Chikkanna) on the trip.

Enroute they are confronted by a strange car, who plays them into a FAST AND FURIOUS scenario, dragging the trio into dangerous and uncomfortable situations. 
Eventually the pathological stalker, kidnaps Mayuri, only to reveal that his target all along was krishna, and that mysterious man turns out to be a joker turned psycho[ p. Ravishankar], waiting to take revenge on krishna for causing the accident that disabled him and killed his young daughter.

krishna reveals, that day he had given his sports car for rent to two rich customers and saw them holding drinks, he then tracks down the real culprits and delivers them to joker, who then takes his revenge by causing the same accidents on them.

The movie concludes with a message to avoid drink and driving, or else the psychotic joker will pursue them.

post credits scene shows Krishna happily married to his love Mayuri, still satirically scared on his memories to that road trip, during his wedding night.

Cast
 Sharan as Krishna/Krish 
 Ashika Ranganath as Mayuri
 Chikkanna as Devanahalli Jagga (DJ) 
 Tabla Nani as Krishna's Father
 Kuri Prathap as Krishna's friend
 Sadhu Kokila as Blind Man
 P. Ravishankar as Joker
 Jahangir as Jahangir Mirchikayi
 Vidyullekha Raman as Sheela
 Shivaraj (K.R.Pete) as a voice-over for Mooshika (Rat)
 Ganesh as a voice-over for Lord Ganesh
 Aindrita Ray in a Special appearance for the song "Dum Maro Dum"
 Sruthi Hariharan- Cameo appearance in a song "Elli Kan Elli Kaneno"
 Shubha Poonja- Cameo appearance in a song "Elli Kan Elli Kaneno"
 Mayuri Kyatari- Cameo appearance in a song "Elli Kan Elli Kaneno"
 Sanchita Padukone- Cameo appearance in a song "Elli Kan Elli Kaneno"
 Bhavana Rao- Cameo appearance in a song "Elli Kan Elli Kaneno"

Soundtrack

Arjun Janya has composed the songs for the film.

Chuttu Chuttu
Chuttu Chuttu song is the most viewed Kannada video song in YouTube. Chuttu Chuttu becomes the first Kannada song to cross 100 Million plus views. Chuttu Chuttu makes into Radio Mirchi top 20. In January 2020, it became the most viewed Kannada song on YouTube. Chuttu Chuttu First Kannada Song to Cross 100 Million Views On YouTube. Team of Raambo 2 celebrates the success of Chuttu Chuttu.

Box office
Raambo 2 opened very well at box-office and grossed more than 9 crores within 2 weeks of its release. The film completed 50 days run in 100 theatres and 25 days run in 125 theatres.
Raambo 2 got positive reviews and the film completed 100 days at the box office and it became a comeback hit for Sharan after a string of flops.

The film is slated to release in United States of America and Australia in June 2018. The movie had television premier on 16 September 2018 and had highest TRP rating as per BARC.

Awards
Raambo 2 was nominated for 8th SIIMA awards in 7 Categories.

Raambo 2 was nominated for Times Kannada Film Awards 2018.

Raambo 2 was selected in the popular films section at 11th Bengaluru International Film Festival (BIFFes) 2019. 

Raambo 2 was nominated for 66th Filmfare Awards South 2019.

References

External links
 
 

2018 films
2010s Kannada-language films
Indian comedy-drama films
Films scored by Arjun Janya
Indian sequel films